Rajahmundry bus station is a bus station located in Rajahmundry city of the Indian state of Andhra Pradesh. It is owned by Andhra Pradesh State Road Transport Corporation. This is one of the major bus stations in the state, with services to all the cities and towns in the state and to other states like Chhattisgarh and Telangana. It is one of the few stations equipped with 5G Internet service.

Expansion works

Station expansion works are proceeding while the city runs city buses from 2017 as the second phase of launching city buses in Andhra Pradesh.

References

Bus stations in Andhra Pradesh
Buildings and structures in Rajahmundry
Transport in Rajahmundry